La Garde is the name of several places:

France

La Garde or Lagarde is the name or part of the name of several communes in France:

 La Garde, Alpes-de-Haute-Provence, in the Alpes-de-Haute-Provence département
 La Garde, Isère, in the Isère département
 La Garde, Var, in the Var département
 La Garde-Adhémar, in the Drôme département
 La Garde-Freinet, in the Var département
 Lagarde, Ariège, in the Ariège département
 Lagarde, Gers, in the Gers département
 Lagarde, Haute-Garonne, in the Haute-Garonne département
 Lagarde, Hautes-Pyrénées, in the Hautes-Pyrénées département
 Lagarde, Moselle, in the Moselle département
 Lagarde-d'Apt, in the Vaucluse département
 Lagarde-Enval, in the Corrèze département
 Lagarde-Hachan, in the Gers département
 Lagarde-Paréol, in the Vaucluse département
 Lagarde-sur-le-Né, in the Charente département

United States
 La Garde Township, Minnesota

See also
 Lagarde (disambiguation)
 Legarde (disambiguation)
 Garde (disambiguation)
 LGarde (company)